Maggie Louie (November 10, 1970) is an American songwriter, guitarist and singer who performed the pop single "Always Be Your Girl" featured on her solo album, Maggie Louie, released in 1999 and as the lead singer of the underground cult band Buttermilk which recorded four albums including Star Spangled Bubblegum (1993) and On Tap (1995). Louie's vocal talents have been described as providing a "fiery emotive delivery" for Buttermilk's "blues rock, jazz, funk, folk and H.O.R.D.E.-style groovy jams." 

In 1998, Louie's life story was optioned as a feature film titled Sincerely Maggie but the movie was never produced. 

Louie's song, "Junky Rhapsody" was featured on Grammy nominee Stanley C. Adkins' 2001 album The Undesirables which was produced by Alex Chilton in New Orleans, LA. Also in 2001, Louie played herself as the lead singer of a bar band in one scene of the TV-Movie, A Passion.

Discography

Albums

 Zzoom – (1988) (Buttermilk)
 Live from the Chameleon – (Maple, 1990) (recorded as Maggie Louie & Buttermilk)	
 Star Spangled Bubblegum – (Maple, 1993) (recorded as Maggie Louie & Buttermilk)	
 On Tap – (Delta & Fishtone Records, 1995) (recorded as Maggie Louie & Buttermilk)
 Maggie Louie – (Orchard, 1999)
 Flight Risk – (unreleased)

Compilation Appearances 
 Southern Sampler – (Lucky13, 1998)
 CMJ presents Certain Damage! Vol 106 – (CMJ, 1999)
 Women Who Rock – (Riffage, 1999)

Appears On 
 The Undesirables – (Yukky Records, 2001)

References

External links
 
 Maggie Louie available on iTunes
 Maggie Louie official website

1970 births
Living people